The Washington Spirit is an American professional soccer club based in the Washington, D.C. metropolitan area that participates in the National Women's Soccer League (NWSL). It is a continuation of the D.C. United Women of the W-League and continues to field both an amateur WPSL team and a youth team, both under the Spirit name.

History

Establishment 
The foundation of the National Women's Soccer League was announced on November 21, 2012, with Washington selected as a host for one of the eight teams selected for the inaugural season. In December 2012, the team's name was announced as the Washington Spirit. D.C. United Women head coach Mike Jorden was kept on as well as assistant coach Cindi Harkes. Harkes is married to the former U.S. international and D.C. United star John Harkes. Bill Lynch,  the original Washington Spirit's owner when the National Women's Soccer League launched in 2013, sold the majority of the team to tech executive Steve Baldwin in late 2018. Several other minority investors have since been added to the ownership group—Jenna Bush Hager and Chelsea Clinton, daughters of U.S. presidents; Olympic gold medal-winning gymnast Dominique Dawes; and most recently (May 2021) Washington Capitals star Alexander Ovechkin.

Inaugural season

On January 11, 2013, as part of the NWSL Player Allocation, goalkeeper Ashlyn Harris (USA), defender Ali Krieger (USA), midfielder Lori Lindsey (USA), defender Robyn Gayle (CAN), midfielder Diana Matheson (CAN), defender Alina Garciamendez (MEX) and midfielder Teresa Worbis (MEX) were named to the team. During the February 7, 2013 NWSL Supplemental Draft, the team selected Stephanie Ochs, Tori Huster, Jordan Angeli, Natasha Kai, Megan Mischler and Heather Cooke.

The Spirit played their first competitive match on April 14, 2013, drawing Boston Breakers 1–1 with Tiffany McCarty scoring the team's first goal assisted by Stephanie Ochs.

The inaugural season saw the Spirit stumble out of the gate under Mike Jorden, who was fired after the first eleven games having won only once in that time. Jorden was replaced by Mark Parsons, who finished the season in 8th (last) place registering only 2 more wins over the season.

2014–2016 successes
After a poor inaugural season, the Spirit would much improve in the 2014 making some key acquisitions including Jodie Taylor and Christine Nairn, both who would finish as the team's tops scorers with 11 and 8 goals, respectively. Finishing 4th, the Spirit made their first NWSL Playoff appearance. They would lose at Seattle Reign.

The Spirit finished the 2015 season with a record of 8–6–6 and repeating their 4th place league position.  The playoff result, again, ended in an away loss to Seattle in the semifinals. The season would be the breakout year for Crystal Dunn who was awarded the 2015 NWSL Golden Boot Award, scoring 15 goals during the campaign. At the conclusion of the season, Mark Parsons stepped down as head coach and general manager to take over as coach of the Portland Thorns FC.

Building off the successes of the 2014 and 2015 seasons, the Spirit hired former Sky Blue FC manager, Jim Gabarra ahead of the 2016 season. The Spirit had their most successful season to date in 2016, being league leaders in the standings throughout most of the season. Only in the final week would the Spirit's loss finalize them as league runners-up. Earning their first post-season victory against Chicago Red Stars, the Spirit would lose the 2016 NWSL Final in penalties to Western New York Flash.

2017–present

In the aftermath of finishing 2016 runners-up, the Spirit saw a series of key departures including captain Ali Krieger (traded to Orlando Pride), Christine Nairn and Diana Matheson (both traded to Seattle Reign), and Crystal Dunn leaving for Chelsea, while retaining her contracting rights. Unable to adequately replace these players, the Spirit struggled to compete throughout the 2017 season ultimately finishing last (10th) for the first time since the inaugural season. However, building for the future, Gabarra was able to recruit U.S. national team prospect, Mallory Pugh mid-season. Pugh would go on to lead the team in scoring, registering 6 goals in 16 games.
The 2018 season continued the Spirit's pursuit of young talent, but also continued the struggle for results. On August 21, after eight straight losses and being eliminated from playoff contention, the Spirit fired head coach, Jim Gabarra, and appointed assistant coach, Tom Torres as interim head coach. Torres lead the Spirit through the final three matches of the season at home, including the Spirit's debut at newly opened Audi Field against Portland Thorns FC on August 25. The match set a new club record for home attendance with 7,976 fans. The season ended with the Spirit finishing in 8th place, just ahead of Sky Blue FC. During the offseason, the Spirit appointed Richie Burke as the new head coach while retaining Torres on the technical staff. The announcement also noted local tech executive Steve Baldwin had become the Spirit's new majority owner.

The 2019 Washington Spirit season marked several changes for the Spirit organization. Owner Steve Baldwin outlined several planned improvements including theme nights for fans, pride night, a gear store in the stadium, and a mascot. The 2019 season also featured major changes on the field; fifteen new players were added to the Spirit roster including Australian national team members Chloe Logarzo and Amy Harrison. The Spirit surpassed their point total from the previous season on May 18 after the 5th game of the season against Portland Thorns FC. They would go on to surpass their past season's point total the next week against the Chicago Red Stars. They ultimately finished 5th in the 2019 NWSL standings.

In September 2021, Burke was fired as head coach following an investigation into allegations of harassment and abusive behavior towards players. CEO Steve Baldwin was also accused of nepotism and retaliatory behavior, leading to fellow co-owner Y. Michelle Kang to call for him to step down and sell his ownership interest in the team. Fans and Spirit players alike echoed this sentiment. On October 14, 2021, the Washington Post reported that Steve Baldwin had announced to club investors that he intended to sell the club. Kang officially became majority owner of the Spirit on March 30, 2022.

The Spirit won their first NWSL Championship on Saturday November 20, 2021, when they defeated the Chicago Red Stars, 2–1 in extra-time at Lynnn Family Stadium in Louisville, Kentucky.

On December 20, 2021, the Spirit announced that interim head coach Kris Ward would become the team's permanent head coach. On August 22, 2022, the Spirit fired Ward after a  record to start the 2022 season. Assistant coach Angela Salem managed the team's match in Houston on August 27 before the club hired Albertin Montoya as interim head coach for the remainder of the season. The Spirit posted a 2-3-0 record in it final five matches under Montoya.

On November 21, 2022, the Spirit announced Mark Parsons as the club's next head coach. Parsons previously served in the role for the Spirit's first three seasons of existence from 2013 through 2015.

Colors and badge
In January 2013, the team unveiled its new colors and badge. The badge was designed to resemble a torch reflecting the notion of "Burning with Spirit." It also contains a crown that holds 11 stars to represent the 11 players on the field and a ball with a single star to represent the 12th player (the team's fans) placed where the fuel for the torch would be representing how the fans "fuel the spirit." All of the components of the badge are "wrapped in the Banner of Spirit for a patriotic theme honoring our flag and all of those who have given their lives and sacrificed much so we can enjoy the freedoms we have."

The logo was designed by freelance designer Pete Schwadel and incorporates the team colors of navy, red, and white, further reinforcing the patriotic theme woven throughout the team's imagery. It also features both "Washington" and "DC" to represent the team's connection with the District and the greater Washington metropolitan area.

The color and design of the 2020/2021 kit reinforces these values. The blue represents the unity of the club with the communities of DC, Virginia and Maryland and the waters of the Potomac River that ties those three parts of the region together. The two red stripes depict the District of Columbia flag and the roots of the club in the nation's capital. The gray stripes signify the constant upward growth of the organization in promoting equality, diversity and inclusion. The red notch reflects the sacrifices made by the players—past, present and future—to fulfill their maximum potential as athletes and leaders in society.

Stadium

The Maryland SoccerPlex, located in Germantown, Maryland, was home to the Washington Spirit beginning with the inaugural 2013 season. The facility was also home to the Washington Spirit Reserves in the WPSL.

Starting during the 2018 season, the Spirit began coordinating with D.C. United to play home matches at Audi Field in Buzzard Point in Washington D.C. The Spirit played their first match on August 25 that season, hosting the Portland Thorns FC. The match registered the team's highest attended game and was viewed as a means to generate more interest in the team. During the 2019 season, the team announced it would host two home matches at Audi Field.

On November 12, 2019, the team announced that in the 2020 season, the Spirit reached an agreement with D.C. United that will split the team's home games between three stadiums, the Maryland SoccerPlex, Audi Field and Segra Field in Leesburg, Virginia for four games each. Due to COVID restrictions, the Spirit played two home matches at Segra Field in 2020. Beginning in 2021, the Spirit split all home matches between Audi Field and Segra Field. although the club still planned to hold at least one preseason game a year at the SoccerPlex after 2020.

On December 6, 2022, the club announced it had reached a deal with D.C. United to become a full-time tenant at Audi Field, playing its full home schedules at the Buzzard Point venue starting with the 2023 season. In addition, the team has relocated its training facilities to United Performance Center in Leesburg, Virginia.

Supporters
The Spirit Squadron is the name of the supporter's group for the Spirit. The group was started by friends Ashley Nichols, Megan Wesson and Tory Johnson. Of the group's founding, Nichols said, "... with a new league we needed to show the team as much support as possible because we really want a women's pro league to stay here in the United States. So between that and wanting to also provide a fun experience for fans, we decided to create the Spirit Squadron."

Rose Room Collective is an independent supporter group for the Washington Spirit and D.C. United by and for people of color (POC). They were founded on a strong desire to have a supporter group in the D.C. area with a more targeted approach to including and amplifying the voices of POC.

In February 2021, The Washington Post reported that Chelsea Clinton, Jenna Bush Hager, Dominique Dawes and Brianna Scurry were part of an investment group investing in the team.

Broadcasting 

In 2020, broadcast rights for NWSL matches was consolidated at the league level. Washington Spirit matches are broadcast on CBS Sports Network, Paramount+ and Twitch. International streaming began in 2021 via geolocked feeds on Twitch.

At the beginning of the 2019 season the Spirit announced a broadcast partnership with NBC Sports Washington and Monumental Sports Network.

As of April 2017, Washington Spirit games are streamed exclusively by Go90 for American audiences and via the NWSL website for international viewers. For the 2017 season, the Spirit will be featured in three nationally televised Lifetime NWSL Game of the Week broadcasts on April 22, June 17, and August 19, 2017.

In 2016, the Spirit's NWSL Playoff game against the Chicago Red Stars was broadcast on Fox Sports 1 and was available for streaming on the company's online streaming platform, Fox Sports Go.

Players

Current squad

Staff

Current staff

Head coaches

Honors
 NWSL Championship
 Winners (1): 2021
 Runners-up: 2016

Award Winners
Most Valuable Player
 Crystal Dunn: 2015

Golden Boot
 Ashley Hatch: 2021
 Crystal Dunn: 2015

Goalkeeper of the Year
 Aubrey Bledsoe: 2019, 2021

Rookie of the Year
 Trinity Rodman: 2021

Best XI First Team
 Ashley Hatch: 2021
 Trinity Rodman: 2021
 Aubrey Bledsoe: 2019
 Crystal Dunn: 2015
 Ali Krieger: 2014
 Diana Matheson: 2013

Best XI Second Team
 Crystal Dunn: 2016
 Jodie Taylor: 2014
 Ali Krieger: 2013, 2016

Year-by-year

See also

 D.C. United Women
 List of top-division football clubs in CONCACAF countries
 List of professional sports teams in the United States and Canada

References

External links

 
 DC Spirit Squadron on Twitter
 Dc DC Spirit Squadron on Facebook

 
National Women's Soccer League teams
Association football clubs established in 2012
2012 establishments in Washington, D.C.
Spirit
Women's soccer clubs in the United States
Phoenix clubs (association football)
Soccer clubs in Maryland